The Oslo tram network (short from , 'electric') is the tram system in Oslo, Norway. It consists of six lines with 99 stops and has a daily ridership of 132,000. The system operates on standard gauge and uses 750 V DC overhead.

History
The first tram in Oslo was opened in 1875 with a short line between Homansbyen west of the city centre, Oslo West Railway Station and a sideline to Grønland, east of the city centre. The first "trams" were in fact horse-drawn vehicles on flanged steel wheels. The first expansion of the line came in 1878 with a line to Grünerløkka just north-east to the city center.

Electric tram service was initiated in 1894 with a line over Briskeby to Majorstuen, a route south of the original Homansbyen line. Horsedrawn service was entirely replaced with electric service in 1900. For a long time, there were two tram companies operating in Oslo, "Grønntrikken" ("The Green Trams" with a green and yellow livery) and "Blåtrikken" ("The Blue Trams" with a blue livery). These companies were merged in 1924. During the 1910s, 1920s and 1930s, the network continued to expand, with the most notable addition being the construction of Ekebergbanen, a line up along the hill along the east side of the Oslo Fjord, south of the city. It was operated by a separate company. It was originally built to Sæter in 1917, the line was completed to Ljabru in 1941. The tram network reached its greatest extent in 1939 with the opening of the northeastern line to Sinsen.

After World War II, the tram network started being gradually being replaced with diesel buses, closures started in 1947, and in 1960, the city council decided to aim for a complete dismantlement of the entire tram system. A number of lines had been replaced with the T-bane subway system, and the versatility of buses was attractive to the local politicians. However, in 1977, the city council rescinded its decision to close the tram system. An order was made for a set of new articulated trams to supplement the aging fleet. The first of these trams, the SL79 was delivered in 1982.

The tram network was expanded slightly in the 1990s. A line over Aker Brygge was added in 1995, and in 1999 an extension of the northwestern Ullevål line was extended past the University of Oslo campus, to the new Rikshospitalet national hospital. A further renewal of the tram fleet by the addition of Italian double-articulated SL95 cars was also started. In 2002 the tram appeared to fall on hard times again. Oslo Sporveier was strapped for cash, and the board passed a decision to close down much of the tram system and replace it with buses. However, such a drastic change of operations forced a general assembly to meet, and most of the closures were cancelled. Finally, only the northernmost line to Kjelsås was closed in November 2002. In 2003, the tram system which had been part of Oslo Sporveier, was fissioned out to a separate company, Oslotrikken. However, Oslotrikken was instructed to drop the "Oslo" prefix in their name shortly after, making Trikken their official name. The line to Kjelsås was reopened in 2004, exactly two years after it was first closed.

The tram network has had a considerable expansion in passenger figures since 2003, but the number of tram departures has only increased by 22.7%. Lack of vehicles is a hindrance for further expansion of the tram service, and although orders for more vehicles are being planned, Ruter have said it will take years before the tram service can be expanded.

Routes
As of 2021 there are six lines, all of which operate daily, usually on a schedule with a 10-minute headway, or 20-minute schedule during late evenings and weekends. Many stretches are operated by two or more lines. In central areas, served by more than one line, there is a maximum of 5-minute headway between trams, a concept named "Rullende fortau" (rolling sidewalk) by the tram company.

Two of the sections are light rail that run on separate tracks rather than in the road:
The Ekeberg Line (Ekebergbanen) is the southernmost route, which runs up the hillside along the east coast of the Oslo Fjord, finally ending at Ljabru. It was one of the lines proposed axed in 2002, but spared at the general assembly. It is served by lines 13 and 19.

The Lilleaker Line, is the most western route, and the only tram line which does not stay within the city limits of Oslo. The last station on the line, Bekkestua, lies in Bærum. The tram line shares track with the Kolsås Line of the subway system between Jar and Bekkestua. The line is served by line 13.

The lines are color-coded, and the colors appear on the line map. Until a few years ago, destination signs had colours on destination signs (now they have digital destination displays.) Line 11 and 13 share colors, as do lines 18 and 19. Some tram maps distinguish between them by giving line 11 a lighter green than line 13, and by making the yellow of line 19 more orange. Up until the 2005 restructuring of the tram system, there was also a line 10 (Jar-Skøyen-Aker Brygge-Jernbanetorget-Ullevål-Rikshospitalet), color-coded blue and a line 15 (Grefsen stasjon-Trondheimsveien-Nationaltheateret-Majorstuen), color-coded red.

The standard service for each line is one tram every 10 minutes, except for the Lilleaker–Bekkestua section of line 13 which is served every 20 minutes, but most of this section is also served every 15 minutes by Line 3 of the Oslo Metro. Lines 11, 12 and 19 are run jointly. A line 11 tram arriving at Majorstuen continues as a line 19, and a line 12 tram continues as line 11 and a line 19 tram continues as line 12. The same applies to the lines 17 and 18 at their terminus Grefsen.

Since lines 11, 12 and 19 run over Majorstuen, where several turns are too sharp for the newer SL-95 trams, they are operated with the lighter SL-79 trams. Lines 17 and 18 run to Rikshospitalet, which need to be operated by the bidirectional SL-95 trams. Both tram types are operating on line 13 but SL79 turns at Lilleaker instead of Bekkestua, where there is no loop.

Line 11

Line 12

Line 13

Line 17

Line 18

Line 19

Rolling stock

Current rolling stock
The Oslo tram system has 72 trams.

The SL18 trams will replace both the SL79 and SL95 trams by 2024.
40 six-axle trams of type SL79, numbered 101–140. These are single-articulated, and operate in one direction only. They were delivered in two batches, the first batch, with 25 trams, started arriving in 1982, the second batch of 15 trams arrived in 1989. The two batches are fairly similar, but with different interiors, and the rear door of the second batch is double. The first ten trams were produced by Duewag of Germany, the rest were produced by ABB at Strømmen, east of Oslo. The trams are 22.18 metres long, 2.50 metres wide, 3,41 metres tall and weigh 32.8 tons. The tram can take 163 passengers, 71 of which are seated.
32 eight-axle trams of type SL95, numbered 141-172 and delivered in 1998–2006. These double-articulated, partly low-floor trams can go backwards as well as forward due to the presence of driver cabs at either end and doors on both sides. They can therefore operate on the Ullevål line to Rikshospitalet and on the Lilleaker Line to Bekkestua which do not have a turning circle at the end of the line. However, the large turning radius and heavy weight of the tram makes it unsuitable for some of the lines to Majorstuen, which have poor tracks and sharp turns. The SL95s were delivered by the Italian company Ansaldo/Firema (then Ansaldobreda, now Hitachi Rail Italy). The SL95 is 33.12 metres long, 2.6 metres wide, 3.62 metres tall and weighs 64.98 tons. The tram has a capacity for 212 passengers, 88 of which are seated.

The SL18 is a six-axle tram of the CAF Urbos 100 family. In 2018, Sporveien and Oslo Vognselskap collaboratively ordered 87 SL18 trams, with an option for a further 60 trams. The first two units were expected for summer 2020, although the COVID-19 pandemic delayed delivery to October 2020. They will be tested in winter conditions in 2020 before the serial production begins. Trial service with passengers commenced in 31 January 2022, which will last over 5 months. The SL18 are bi-directional, five-segmented, 100% low-floor trams that will be much lighter and quieter than the SL95.

There are also some old trams which are brought out on special occasions. During the summer, tram no. 70 together with trailer no. 647 operates scheduled trips on Sundays. It was built by Falkenried in Hamburg, Germany in 1913 for Grønntrikken. It remained in regular passenger service until 1968 and continued to serve as a maintenance vehicle. For the tram's 100 year jubilee, the no. 70 tram was restored in 1994. Trailer no. 647, complete with the classical open platforms, is a replica of an old trailer, built from parts from tram no. 71.

Former rolling stock
The fifty 4-axle Høka motor cars (designated SM53 and numbered 204-253) entered service in 1952–58. These were not articulated trams, but usually pulled a matching trailer (designated ST55 and numbered 551-580) in order to increase capacity. In the mid-1980s eleven of these motor cars were rebuilt and modernised. These trams were given the designation SM83 and numbered 261–271. All these trams were retired in 2000 when Oslo Sporveier increased the voltage of the network from 600 V to 750 V.
 In 1954, with 30 Høka cars in service, one started manufacturing a type of hybrid cars, with a body similar to the Høka, though a bit smaller, built upon the undercarriage of existing, 2-axle, older cars. This type of car was called "kylling" ("chicken") because it was smaller than the new 4-axle cars built at HØNEfoss ("høne" = "hen"). The kylling cars were in service from 1954 until 1982. Matching trailers were also manufactured on the same principle, but these were mainly pulled by the Høka cars, as they proved too heavy to pull for the kylling cars.
In the early 1990s, the line over Storo was cut off from its turning circle terminus due to construction work. To get around this problem, a number of old trams were purchased from Gothenburg at the price of 1 krone each. These trams, which had been built between 1958 and 1962, and designated M25 in Gothenburg, were coupled back-to-back so that a driver's cabin was available at either end of the train. They were designated SM91 in Oslo. The condition of the SM91 was somewhat better than the aging Høka cars, so they replaced them. The SM91 was never popular with passengers, they were as noisy as the Høka, and the rear doors, which would only allow people out of the tram, had to be pushed open manually by passengers from the inside. After a fatal accident involving the doors of this tram type in January 2001, the trams were no longer run coupled together. They were finally retired in November 2002.

References

External links

Oslo Tramway's website (in Norwegian)
Oslo Tramway's website (in English)
Oslo Metro Lines Map (PDF file)
Fare and timetable information
Railfaneurope.net image gallery
About the no. 70 tram and no. 647 trailer
Tram Travels: Sporveien trikken i Oslo

 
Rail transport in Oslo
Public transport in Oslo
Tram transport in Norway
1875 establishments in Norway
750 V DC railway electrification
Oslo